Desperate Hours is a 1990 American neo-noir action thriller film, and a remake of the 1955 William Wyler crime drama of the same title. Both films are based on the 1954 novel by Joseph Hayes, who also co-wrote the script for this film with Lawrence Konner and Mark Rosenthal. (Rosenthal and Konner's other collaborations include the screenplay of Superman IV: The Quest For Peace.) Desperate Hours stars Mickey Rourke, Anthony Hopkins, Mimi Rogers, Kelly Lynch, Lindsay Crouse, Elias Koteas and David Morse. It is directed by Michael Cimino, who had previously worked with Rourke on the films Heaven's Gate and Year of the Dragon.

Plot

In Utah, Nancy Breyers is a defense lawyer who is inexplicably in love with client Michael Bosworth, an intelligent and sociopathic convict. During a break from a courtroom hearing, Nancy sneaks a gun to Bosworth. After Bosworth snaps a guard's neck, Bosworth and Nancy slip away.

Bosworth tears at Nancy's clothing and leaves her behind, where she will tell authorities Bosworth held her at gunpoint during his escape. He speeds off in a car with his brother Wally, and their partner, the hulking, half-witted Albert, then changes cars with one Nancy has left for him in a remote location.

In the meantime, decorated Vietnam veteran Tim Cornell arrives at his former home with his ex-wife Nora, who have two kids—15-year-old May and her 8-year-old brother Zack. Tim and Nora separated due to his infidelity with a younger woman, and Tim shows up trying to reconcile with Nora, with whom he is still in love.

Needing a hideout until Nancy can catch up with them, the Bosworth brothers and Albert settle on the Cornells' home with a "For Sale" sign which is seemingly picked by Bosworth at random. Bosworth picks up intimate details of the Cornells, and one by one all of them find themselves the prisoners of the Bosworth brothers and Albert.

Nancy's innocent act does not fool FBI agent Brenda Chandler, who puts surveillance on her every move. Nancy eventually cuts a deal with Chandler to have charges against her reduced by betraying Bosworth.

As young Zack tries to escape through a window, a friend of the Cornells who visits the house by chance meets him. Bosworth makes the family friend enter inside by force, and as they talk, Bosworth shoots him, then makes Albert dispose of the body as Albert gets anxiety-ridden and decides to go off on his own. As Albert leaves while covered in blood, he intercepts two college girls, who expose his presence to a small gas station owner. The owner calls the authorities who chase after Albert. Albert ignores their order to surrender and is killed by the police on a river bank.

Nancy begs Agent Chandler to give her a gun, but unbeknownst to Nancy, Chandler removes the bullets. As she goes to the Cornells' house, the house gets surrounded, and as a shootout starts by Bosworth, Wally is fatally wounded in a barrage of FBI bullets and falls on top of a shocked Nancy. Wally's gun is taken away by Tim. Bosworth holds a gun on Nora and is prepared to use it if Tim interferes. He is unaware that Tim has removed the bullets. Tim then drags the criminal outside, where Bosworth ignores the FBI's order to surrender, and is fatally shot.

Cast
 Mickey Rourke as Michael Bosworth
 Anthony Hopkins as Tim Cornell
 Mimi Rogers as Nora Cornell
 Kelly Lynch as Nancy Breyers
 Lindsay Crouse as FBI Agent Chandler
 John Finn as Lexington
 Elias Koteas as Wally Bosworth
 David Morse as Albert
 Shawnee Smith as May Cornell
 Danny Gerard as Zack Cornell
 Matt McGrath as Kyle
 Gerry Bamman as Ed Tallant
 Ellen McElduff as Bank Teller

Production
Parts of the film were shot in Salt Lake City, Echo Junction, Orem, Zion, and Capitol Reef in Utah.

Reception
The film was a commercial disappointment and received split reviews. Critic and movie historian Leonard Maltin referred to the film as "ludicrous... with no suspense, an at-times-laughable music score, and Shawnee Smith as a daughter/victim you'll beg to see cold-cocked."

The film holds a 29% "rotten" rating on the reviews aggregation site Rotten Tomatoes based on 14 reviews.

Christopher Tookey, reviewing the film for the Sunday Telegraph called Desperate Hours "one of those films which should never have been released, even on parole - a danger to itself."

Mickey Rourke earned a Razzie Award nomination for Worst Actor for his performance in the film (also for Wild Orchid), but lost to Andrew Dice Clay for The Adventures of Ford Fairlane.

See also 

 List of films featuring home invasions

References

External links

Desperate Hours at Unofficial french website

1990 films
1990s psychological thriller films
American psychological thriller films
Remakes of American films
1990s English-language films
Films based on American novels
Films directed by Michael Cimino
Films produced by Dino De Laurentiis
Films scored by David Mansfield
Films set in Utah
Films shot in Utah
Home invasions in film
Films about hostage takings
Metro-Goldwyn-Mayer films
American neo-noir films
1990s American films